Thornwell–Presbyterian College Historic District is a historic district on the Presbyterian College campus in Clinton, Laurens County, South Carolina. The majority of the 52 buildings in the district were constructed in the early 1900s, around plans by landscape architect Charles Wellford Leavitt.

The district was listed on the National Register of Historic Places in 1982.

References

Presbyterian College
University and college buildings on the National Register of Historic Places in South Carolina
Historic districts on the National Register of Historic Places in South Carolina
National Register of Historic Places in Laurens County, South Carolina
Colonial Revival architecture in South Carolina
Georgian Revival architecture in South Carolina
Buildings and structures in Laurens County, South Carolina